Maccabi Tzur Shalom Bialik is an Israeli women's football club from Kiryat Bialik competing in the Israeli First League and the Israeli Women's Cup.

History
The club was established in 2005 and played most of its seasons in the league's first division, achieving its best placing, 5th, in 2008–09, before dropping to the second division at the end of the 2011–12 season. In its first season in the second division, the club finished as runners-up and faced Bnot Sakhnin in a promotion/relegation play-off, but lost 0–11 and remained in the second division. The following season, the club won the second division and was promoted to the first division. However, the club didn't fare well in the top division, losing all its matches and scoring just three goals, and relegated back to the second division.

The club also competes in the Israeli Women's Cup, but never reached more than the quarter-finals. The club reached the semi final of the Second Division League Cup in 2012–13, but lost to Bnot Caesarea Tiv'on.

Titles
Israeli 2nd Division (1)
2013–14

2014-15 squad

References

External links
 Maccabi Tzur Shalom Bialik Israeli Football Association 

Women's football clubs in Israel
Association football clubs established in 2005